The Kendall Young Library is located in Webster City, Iowa, United States.  The library was established in 1896 from an endowment left by Kendall Young. The historic building was designed by the Chicago architectural firm of Patton & Miller.  The library is an elaborate Beaux-Arts style building.  The main facade is largely composed of rusticated masonry.  The columns of the portico are of the Ionic order.  The delivery room on the interior features a stained glass dome. It was listed on the National Register of Historic Places in 1983.

References

1896 establishments in Iowa
Library buildings completed in 1916
Beaux-Arts architecture in Iowa
Buildings and structures in Hamilton County, Iowa
Public libraries in Iowa
Libraries on the National Register of Historic Places in Iowa
National Register of Historic Places in Hamilton County, Iowa